The 2001 All-Ireland Under-21 Hurling Championship was the 38th staging of the All-Ireland Under-21 Hurling Championship, the Gaelic Athletic Association's premier inter-county hurling tournament for players under the age of twenty-one. The championship began on 6 June 2001 and ended on 16 September 2001.

Limerick were the defending champions.

On 16 September 2001, Limerick won the championship following a 0-17 to 2-10 defeat of Wexford in the All-Ireland final. This was their second All-Ireland title in succession and their third title overall.

Limerick's Mark Keane was the championship's top scorer with 3-29.

Results

Leinster Under-21 Hurling Championship

Quarter-finals

Semi-finals

Final

Munster Under-21 Hurling Championship

Quarter-finals

Semi-finals

Final

Ulster Under-21 Hurling Championship

All-Ireland Under-21 Hurling Championship

Semi-finals

Final

Scoring statistics

Top scorers overall

Top scorers in a single game

References

Under-21
All-Ireland Under-21 Hurling Championship